Drug identifiers include:
 Drug nomenclature
 Pharmaceutical codes